Muhabbat Arapovna Sharapova is a mathematician from Uzbekistan. She has received the title O‘zbekiston Qahramoni (Hero of Uzbekistan).

Biography 
Sharapova is a mathematics teacher at a boarding school in Karshi, Kashkadarya region. In 2007 she received a national award as an Honored Worker in Public Education. In 2016 she was made a Hero of Uzbekistan.

Recognition
She was recognized as one of the BBC's 100 women of 2017.

References

Living people
Uzbekistani women mathematicians
Year of birth missing (living people)